The 2016–17 season was Paris Saint-Germain Football Club's 44th professional season since its creation in 1970, and its 43rd consecutive season in the top-flight of French football.

That was the club's first season without record goalscorer Zlatan Ibrahimović since the 2011–12 campaign.

Players

French teams are limited to four players without EU citizenship. The squad list includes only the principal nationality of each player; several non-European players on the squad have dual citizenship with an EU country. Also, players from the ACP countries—countries in Africa, the Caribbean, and the Pacific that are signatories to the Cotonou Agreement—are not counted against non-EU quotas due to the Kolpak ruling.

Squad

Transfers

In 
For Recent transfers: List of French football transfers winter 2016–17

Out

Pre-season and friendlies

Friendlies

International Champions Cup

Competitions

Overview

Trophée des Champions

Ligue 1

League table

Results summary

Results by round

Matches

Coupe de France

Coupe de la Ligue

UEFA Champions League

Group stage

Knockout phase

Round of 16

Statistics

Appearances and goals

|-
! colspan="16" style="background:#dcdcdc; text-align:center"| Goalkeepers

|-
! colspan="16" style="background:#dcdcdc; text-align:center"| Defenders

|-
! colspan="16" style="background:#dcdcdc; text-align:center"| Midfielders

|-
! colspan="16" style="background:#dcdcdc; text-align:center"| Forwards

|-
! colspan="16" style="background:#dcdcdc; text-align:center"| Players transferred out during the season
|-

References

External links

Paris Saint-Germain F.C. seasons
Paris Saint-Germain
Paris Saint-Germain